Arthur J. Noonan (November 24, 1951 – September 17, 2022) was a Democratic Party member of the Montana House of Representatives, representing District 73 from 2004 to 2009, who also served as Minority Floor Leader.

Noonan died after a heart attack at his home in Butte, on September 17, 2022, at the age of 70.

References

External links
Montana House of Representatives - Art Noonan official MT State Legislature website
Project Vote Smart - Representative Art Noonan (MT) profile
Follow the Money - Art Noonan
2006 2004 2000 campaign contributions

1951 births
2022 deaths
Democratic Party members of the Montana House of Representatives
Politicians from Butte, Montana